Jergens is a surname. Notable people with the surname include:

Adele Jergens (1917–2002), American actress
Diane Jergens (1935–2018), American actress, singer, and dancer

See also
Andrew Jergens Company
Jurgens